Ajith Mannapperuma (Born 25 July 1963) is a Sri Lankan politician. A current Member of Parliament from Gampaha District, he was a former state minister of Mahaveli Development and Environment.

Education 
Educated at Holy Cross College, Gampaha; Bandaranayake College and Ananda College; he graduated from the  Faculty of Engineering of the University of Moratuwa and became a Civil Engineer. And also He ranked island 9th in Advance Level exam in year 1982 in math stream and entered to University of Moratuwa Sri Lanka. He is a prestigious alumni from University of Moratuwa.

Political career 
Mannapperuma joined the United National Party and entered local government politics. He served as the first mayor of Gampaha from 2002 to 2009, before being elected to the Western Provincial Council in 2009. He entered parliament in 2013 from the Gampaha District following the unexpected demise of Jayalath Jayawardena. Mannapperuma was returned to parliament in 2015 from the Gampaha District. In 2021, he failed to gained the required preferential votes to be elected to parliament, however was appointed to parliament to succeed Ranjan Ramanayake after the latter lost his parliamentary seat following his imprisonment with his conviction of contempt of court.

Personal life 
In 2014 Mannapperuma lost a limb following an accident on the Southern Expressway.

References

Living people
State ministers of Sri Lanka
Members of the 14th Parliament of Sri Lanka
Members of the 15th Parliament of Sri Lanka
Members of the 16th Parliament of Sri Lanka
Members of the Western Provincial Council
Mayors of Gampaha
Samagi Jana Balawegaya politicians
United National Party politicians
Sri Lankan civil engineers
1963 births